Marie Koopmans-de Wet (1834–1906), was a South African philanthropist.

She was the daughter of Johannes de Wet and Adriana Horak and married Johan Christoffel Koopmans. She was an influential member of the wealthy Boer elite in Cape Town. Her house was a center of the colony's high society, frequented by the British governor.

She is known as an activist in favor of the preservation of the Afrikaner language and culture during the period of the British Empire in South Africa.

During the Second Boer War, she worked to approve the conditions of the Boer women and children who had been interned by the British. She attracted the attention of Queen Victoria to the issue, and was herself placed in house arrest because of it.

Her house became the Koopmans-de Wet House Museum.

References 

1834 births
1906 deaths
19th-century South African people
19th-century South African women
People of the Second Boer War
South African philanthropists
19th-century philanthropists
19th-century women philanthropists